The swimming competitions at the 2018 Mediterranean Games in Tarragona took place between 23 and 25 June at the Campclar Aquatic Center.

Athletes competed in 38 events and 2 paralympic events.

Schedule

Medal summary

Men's events

Women's events

Paralympic events

Medal table

References

External links
2018 Mediterranean Games – Swimming

 
Sports at the 2018 Mediterranean Games
2018
Mediterranean Games